"Funkahdafi" is a 1985 song by Belgian electronic band Front 242 about Libyan leader Muammar Gaddafi. The song is one of the band's concert favourites. "Funkahdafi" first appeared on the EP Politics of Pressure (1985) and was written by Daniel Bressanutti. It also appeared on the band's compilation album Back Catalogue (1987).

Song
The song opens with a vocal sample of American religious leader and political activist Louis Farrakhan at a Non-Aligned Movement meeting. The lines in question are: We who are oppressed love those who fight against oppression and the oppressors. Brothers and sisters, it is with great honor and privilege that I present to you the leader of the El Fatah revolution... From Libya, our brother Muhammar El Kahdafi.

References

1985 songs
Front 242 songs
English-language Belgian songs
Songs about politicians
Songs about military officers
Songs about Libya
Songs based on speech samples
Cultural depictions of Muammar Gaddafi
Louis Farrakhan